Jörg Hoffmann (born 15 March 1963 in Sondershausen) is an East German luger who competed from the mid-1980s to 1990. Together with Jochen Pietzsch he won two medals in the men's doubles event with a gold in 1988 and a bronze in 1984.

Hoffmann also found great success at the FIL World Luge Championships with a total of seven medals, including four gold (Men's doubles: 1983, 1985, 1987; Mixed team: 1990), one silver (Men's singles: 1985), and two bronzes (Men's doubles: 1989, 1990). He also won three medals at the FIL European Luge Championships with two golds (Men's doubles and mixed team: both 1990) and one silver (Men's doubles: 1986).

Hoffmann won the overall Luge World Cup title in men's doubles in 1983-4.

References

External links
DatabaseOlympics.com  information on Hoffman
Fuzilogik Sports – Winter Olympic results – Men's luge
Hickoksports.com results on Olympics champions in luge and skeleton.
Hickok sports information on World champions in luge and skeleton.
List of men's doubles luge World Cup champions since 1978.

1963 births
Living people
People from Sondershausen
German male lugers
Lugers at the 1984 Winter Olympics
Lugers at the 1988 Winter Olympics
Olympic gold medalists for East Germany
Olympic bronze medalists for East Germany
Olympic lugers of East Germany
Olympic medalists in luge
National People's Army military athletes
Medalists at the 1984 Winter Olympics
Sportspeople from Thuringia
Medalists at the 1988 Winter Olympics
Recipients of the Patriotic Order of Merit in gold
20th-century German people